Lasse is a common masculine given name in Nordic countries. It is also often a nickname for people named Lars or Lauri.

People
Notable people named Lasse include:
Lasse Aasland (1926–2001), Norwegian politician
Lasse Åberg (born 1940), Swedish actor, musician, film director and artist
Lasse Gjertsen (born 1984), Norwegian animator
Lasse Granqvist (born 1967), Swedish sports commentator
Lasse Hallström (born 1946), Swedish film director
Lasse Holm (born 1943), Swedish composer, lyricist and singer
Lasse Jensen, professor of theoretical chemistry
Lasse Karjalainen (born 1974), Finnish retired footballer
Lasse Kjus (born 1971), Norwegian former alpine skier
Lasse Kukkonen (born 1981), Finnish hockey defenceman
Lasse Mårtenson (1934–2016), Finnish singer and composer
Lasse Nielsen (disambiguation)
Lasse Nieminen (born 1966), Finnish ice hockey player
Lasse Pirjetä (born 1974), Finnish hockey forward
Lasse Pöysti (1927–2019), Finnish actor
Lasse Qvist (born 1987), Danish football player
Lasse Rimmer (born 1972), Danish comedian
Lasse Sætre (born 1974), Norwegian retired speed skater
Lasse Sobiech (born 1991), German footballer
Lasse Thoresen (born 1949), Norwegian composer and writer
Lasse Virén (born 1949), Finnish Olympic champion long-distance runner
Lasse Wiklöf (1944–2008), politician in the Åland Islands of Finland

See also
Lars
Lassie

Masculine given names
Scandinavian masculine given names
Swedish masculine given names
Danish masculine given names
Norwegian masculine given names
Finnish masculine given names